Amalgamated Dynamics, Inc.  (ADI) is an American special effects company specializing in animatronics and prosthetic make-up, headquartered in Chatsworth, California. It was founded in 1988 by Stan Winston alumni Tom Woodruff Jr. and Alec Gillis who hails from Phoenix, Arizona. Notable work includes Death Becomes Her, for which they won an Academy Award for Best Visual Effects, Starship Troopers, which was also nominated for an Oscar, and the practical creature effects seen in the Alien franchise from Alien 3 onward. Woodruff also portrays creatures in the films ADI works on, such as the Alien.

In 2013, Amalgamated Dynamics successfully ran a Kickstarter campaign to fund their independent horror film titled Harbinger Down, which was directed by Gillis and produced by Woodruff Jr. The film was released in August 2015 and features exclusively practical creature effects. The impetus for the project began when ADI were frustrated that their practical effects for The Thing, which tried to follow closely the ones featured in the original 1982 film, had been mostly digitally replaced with computer-generated imagery by order of the studio.

Filmography

1980s
 Teen Witch (1989)

1990s
 Tremors (1990)
 The Grifters (1990) 
 Point Break (1991) 
 Alien 3 (1992)
 Death Becomes Her (1992)
 Demolition Man (1993)
 Wolf (1994) – animatronic designers: mechanical wolf 
 The Santa Clause (1994) 
 Mortal Kombat (1995) 
 Jumanji (1995) 
 Tremors 2: Aftershocks (1996)
 Mars Attacks! (1996)
 Michael (1996) 
 Alien Resurrection (1997) 
 Starship Troopers (1997)
 The X-Files (1998)
 My Favorite Martian (1999)
 The Astronaut's Wife (1999) 
 Bats (1999)

2000s
 Nutty Professor II: The Klumps (2000)
 Hollow Man (2000) 
 Bedazzled (2000) 
 The 6th Day (2000)
 Cast Away (2000)
 Evolution (2001) 
 Bubble Boy (2001) 
 Tremors 3: Back to Perfection (2001)
 John Q (2002)
 Panic Room (2002)
 Spider-Man (2002)
 The Santa Clause 2 (2002) 
 Scary Movie 3 (2003)
 Looney Tunes: Back in Action (2003)
 Spider-Man 2 (2004)
 Alien vs. Predator (2004)  
 Elektra (2005) 
 Stealth (2005) 
 Failure to Launch (2006)
 All the King's Men  (2006)
 The Santa Clause 3: The Escape Clause (2006) 
 Wild Hogs (2007)
 Spider-Man 3 (2007)
 Aliens vs. Predator: Requiem (2007)
 The Incredible Hulk (2008) 
 Lonely Street (2009)  
 Race to Witch Mountain (2009)
 Dragonball: Evolution (2009) 
 X-Men Origins: Wolverine (2009)
 G-Force (2009) 
 Cirque du Freak: The Vampire's Assistant (2009)
 Old Dogs (2009)

2010s
 Skyline (2010)
 Beastly (2011) 
 X-Men: First Class (2011) 
 Zookeeper (2011) 
 The Thing (2011)
 Beautiful Wave (2012)
 Odd Thomas (2013)
 Grown Ups 2 (2013)
 Percy Jackson: Sea of Monsters (2013)
 Ender's Game (2013)
 Godzilla (2014)
 Kids vs Monsters (2015)
 Maze Runner: The Scorch Trials (2015)
 Harbinger Down (2015)
 Fire City: End of Days (2015)
 Rakka (2017)
 It (2017) 
 Sorry to Bother You (2018)
 The Predator (2018)
 Godzilla: King of the Monsters (2019)

2020s
 Guest House (2020)
 Godzilla vs. Kong (2021)
 Prey (2022)
 Smile (2022)

References

External links 
 

Special effects companies
Best Visual Effects Academy Award winners
Entertainment companies established in 1988
Privately held companies based in California